Harris Addition Historic District is a national historic district located at St. Joseph, Missouri. The district encompasses 288 contributing buildings and 1 contributing site in a predominantly residential section of St. Joseph. It developed between about 1866 and 1940, and includes representative examples of Colonial Revival, Tudor Revival, and American Craftsman style architecture. Notable buildings include the William Payne House (1889), W.C. Green Apartment Building (c. 1910), C.B. Powers House (c. 1888), the Parry-Motter House designed by architect Edmond Jacques Eckel (1845–1934), and a number of speculative houses built by George J. Englehart and W.H. Haynes.

It was listed on the National Register of Historic Places in 2003.

References

Historic districts on the National Register of Historic Places in Missouri
Colonial Revival architecture in Missouri
Tudor Revival architecture in Missouri
Historic districts in St. Joseph, Missouri
National Register of Historic Places in Buchanan County, Missouri